Calamotropha argenticilia is a moth in the family Crambidae. It was described by George Hampson in 1896. It is found in Sri Lanka, India and Bhutan.

Description
The wingspan is 16 mm. Male pure silvery white. Palpi tinged with fulvous at base. Forewings with fine pale fuscous, slightly sinuous erect medial line. A similar submarginal line slightly excurved between veins 6 and 3. A black marginal line present with silvery cilia.

References

Crambinae
Moths described in 1896